The Fresh Breeze Monster is a German paramotor, designed and produced by Fresh Breeze of Wedemark for powered paragliding.

Design and development
The aircraft was designed in the 2000s as a paramotor with greater power to lift heavier pilots and for two-place flying. It features a paraglider-style high-wing, single-place or two-place-in-tandem accommodation and a single  Hirth F-33 engine in pusher configuration. As is the case with all paramotors, take-off and landing is accomplished by foot.

Variants
Monster CB
In production in 2012, this model has "comfort bar" flexible push rods that counteract engine torque.
Monster Jettison
In production in 2012, this model retains the jettisonable engine feature of the earliest models.

Specifications (Monster)

References

External links

2000s German ultralight aircraft
Single-engined pusher aircraft
Paramotors
Monster